Ukue (Epinmi) is an Edoid language of Ondo State, Nigeria. It is sometimes considered the same language as Ehuẹun.

Phonology

Unusually, it has fricatives but no sibilants. The inventory is:

(*See Edo for a likely interpretation of the two rhotics.)

References

Edoid languages